Richard Murphy OBE (born 24 April 1955) is a British architect and businessman. He is the founder and principal architect of Richard Murphy Architects, an architectural firm operating in Edinburgh. He is a winner of the 2016 RIBA House of the year.

Life
Richard Murphy completed his studies at Newcastle University and Edinburgh University. In 1991 he formed an Edinburgh architectural firm, Richard Murphy Architects, and it has since grown to over twenty architects. In the early years, his firm focused on designing extensions to houses and mews conversions; it has, however, subsequently diversified into education, healthcare, the arts and commercial work. They have worked on several UK National Lottery-funded buildings.

In 1995 Murphy designed the first of the UK's Maggie's Centres, in Edinburgh, which now acts as the administrative headquarters for Maggie's. Designed to aid cancer treatment, the building was designed without any corridors, to avoid an institutional feel.

While teaching at Edinburgh University, he researched the work of the Venetian architect Carlo Scarpa, and later published a book on Scarpa. Later, Murphy presented a Channel 4 documentary on him. He also co-wrote "An Architect's Appreciation of Charles Rennie Mackintosh". In 2004 Murphy exhibited at the Venice Biennale. In 2012, Richard Murphy Architects published a book entitled "Of Its Time and of Its Place: The Work of Richard Murphy Architects."

Murphy is a Member of the RIBA, a Fellow of the RIAS, an Academician of the Royal Scottish Academy, a Fellow of the Royal Society of Arts, a Fellow of the Royal Society of Edinburgh and an Honorary Fellow of Napier University. Richard Murphy Architects has also won a total of 20 RIBA Awards.

He was appointed an OBE in the New Year's Honours January 2007 for services to architecture, the only practising architect on the list.

Murphy has held lectures in places such as Scotland, Edinburgh University, the student-led 5710 lecture society of The Scott Sutherland School of Architecture and The Built Environment, Aberdeen, and Strathclyde University in Glasgow. In 2006 he completed a lecture tour in South Africa, and on 13 March 2012, gave a conference titled "Architecture of its time and its place" to students at Barcelona Institute of Architecture. Most recently, Murphy lectured at the Association of Icelandic Architects in 2015.

He previously completed a modern mews-style house at Calton Hill near Edinburgh Castle, for his own use, and says he lives "pretty simply". More recently Richard Murphy completed his own house on Hart Street in 2015 which won the Saltire Society Award for Best Single Dwelling New Build.

Teaching 
Richard Murphy has teaching experience at Robert Gordon University and Edinburgh College of Art. He has also taught internationally, at Technical University of Braunschweig, University of Virginia, and Syracuse University, New York.

Proposed work
 Candleriggs Quarter in Glasgow's Merchant City
 Perth Theatre, Fife

Notable completed work
Projects by year of design

 Fruitmarket Gallery, Edinburgh, 1991
 Maggie's Edinburgh, Edinburgh, 1994 + 1999 extension
 Nominated for 1997 Stirling Prize
 Dundee Contemporary Arts, Dundee, 1996
 Eastgate Theatre & Arts Centre, Peebles, 1998
 Nominated for 2004 RIAS Best Building in Scotland
 Caernarfon Arts Centre, Wales, 2000
 Olorosso Restaurant, Edinburgh, 2001
 John Muir's Birthplace, Dunbar, East Lothian, 2001
 Computer Centre, Merchiston Campus, Napier University, Edinburgh, 2001
 Tolbooth Arts Centre, Stirling, 2002
 British High Commission, Sri Lanka, 2008
 Housing Moore Street, Glasgow, 2008
 University of East London - Computer and Conference Centre, London, 2009
 Stratheden Dementia and Mental Health Unit, Fife, 2009
 Justice Mill Lane Park Inn Hotel and Office Development, Aberdeen, 2011
 Queen's University Belfast Postgraduate Accommodation, Belfast, 2012
 Old See House Mental Health Facility (in association with RPP Architects), Belfast, 2014
 Postgraduate Housing for The University of Edinburgh, Edinburgh, 2014
 Dunfermline Museum and Art Gallery, Fife, 2017

See also
European Architecture Students Assembly

References

External links
 Official site
 Richard Murphy: Ten Years of Practice at RIBA website
  The 5710 Lecture Series and Society
 "British High Commission, Sri Lanka" on Architecture News Plus

Alumni of Newcastle University
Alumni of the University of Edinburgh
Academics of the University of Edinburgh
Living people
Architects from Edinburgh
1955 births
Place of birth missing (living people)